Saint-Donat, Quebec may refer to:

Saint-Donat, Lanaudière, Quebec in Matawinie Regional County Municipality
Saint-Donat, Bas-Saint-Laurent, Quebec in La Mitis Regional County Municipality